A transvestite pass was a doctor's note recognized by the governments of Imperial Germany and the Weimar Republic – under the support of sexologist Magnus Hirschfeld – identifying a person as a transvestite. Transvestite at this time referred to all individuals whose gender identity or preferred clothing was discordant to that associated with their assigned sex, and so included both crossdressing and transgender people.

In either 1908 or 1909, the first known pass was issued to a female-to-male transvestite. This was achieved with the expert opinion of Hirschfeld as well as Karl Abraham. From then up until 1933, "perhaps dozens" of such passes were granted by the German police. Mainly given to middle-class, heterosexual, male-to-female transvestites to avoid associations with gay and lesbian culture in Weimar Germany, the certificate said that the individual in question was allowed to wear clothing which corresponded to their gender identity.

In 1922, guidance issued by the police headquarters of Berlin with respect to this policy stated:Apart from male prostitution, transvestism in general has no criminal significance. The widespread public opinion that the disguised individuals are generally criminals in disguise (pickpockets, spies, pimps, etc.) is obsolete. With regard to the male transvestites, recent experience shows that even the formerly taken-for-granted view that men in women's clothing are all homosexuals is no longer tenable. [...] On the basis of this insight emerges a duty of gentle treatment [schonenden Behandlung] of transvestites, as long as they are not engaged in male prostitution.

However, the use of these transvestite certificates did not end when the Nazis came to power in 1933 and the Institute for Sexual Science was destroyed on May 6, 1933.  But it can be assumed that considering the center was destroyed, the certificates probably were not accepted by the Nazi party affilliated power structures.

See also
 Transgender rights in Germany (since 1980)

References

External links

Cross-dressing
Transgender history in Germany
1900s in LGBT history
1920s in LGBT history
Weimar culture
Gender nonconformity
1910s in LGBT history
1930s in LGBT history
Transgender law
Transgender rights in Germany
Transgender and medicine